Parliamentary elections were held in  Kosovo on 24 October 2004. This was the second time the Assembly of Kosovo had a national election. The first form of national elections in Kosovo were in the 2001 Kosovan parliamentary election. They were the first national elections that were only partially dependent on OSCE institutions.  The next election would be the 2007 Kosovan parliamentary election.

Results

References

Elections in Kosovo
Elections in Serbia
Kosovo
2004 elections in Serbia
2004 in Kosovo
Elections in Serbia and Montenegro
October 2004 events in Europe